Eupithecia sabulosata is a moth in the family Geometridae first described by James Halliday McDunnough in 1944. It is found in the US state of California.

The wingspan is 22–23 mm. The forewings and body are pale yellowish or ocherous.

The larvae feed on Thuja plicata. The larvae are various shades of green with a brown head.

References

Moths described in 1944
sabulosata
Moths of North America